Le Rail Maghreb was a rail transport related magazine covering the countries of North Africa and the Maghreb. It was published in French. It was the only specialist rail transport news publication covering Algeria, Morocco and Tunisia.

The magazine was published by Groupe Actis on a bimonthly basis with a readership of public and private rail sector professionals. The first issue appeared in November 2007. The magazine ended publication in June 2014.

See also
 List of railroad-related periodicals

References

External links
 LeRail (in French)
 LeRail Maghreb (in French)

2007 establishments in Algeria
2014 disestablishments in Algeria
Magazines published in Algeria
Bi-monthly magazines
Defunct magazines published in Algeria
French-language magazines
Magazines established in 2007
Magazines disestablished in 2014
Rail transport magazines